Pratibha Advani is an Indian talk show host anchor and a television producer. She is the daughter of L. K. Advani, former deputy Prime Minister of India. She heads Swayam Infotainment, a media company engaged in the production of entertainment software for Indian television. She is producer of two famous shows on the broadcast network Doordarshan: Yaadein and Take Care.

Advani also hosted many other shows like Retake with Pratibha Advani and Namaste Cinema. She produced a documentary film Ananya Bharati on the subject of patriotism in Hindi cinema.

References

External links 
 Hindustan Times (Ram and only Ram) 
 Indiantelevision.com
 LK.Advani’s daughter anchors a chat show
 Pratibha on politics and beyond
 Is Prathibha the apparent heir
 Pratibha Advani with her parents

Indian women television presenters
Indian television presenters
Indian television producers
Living people
Year of birth missing (living people)
Sindhi people